Pasindu Sooriyabandara (born 19 October 1999) is a Sri Lankan cricketer. He made his first-class debut for Sinhalese Sports Club in the 2018–19 Premier League Tournament on 7 December 2016. He made his Twenty20 debut on 4 January 2020, for Sinhalese Sports Club in the 2019–20 SLC Twenty20 Tournament. He made his List A debut on 28 March 2021, for Moors Sports Club in the 2020–21 Major Clubs Limited Over Tournament.

References

External links
 

1999 births
Living people
Sri Lankan cricketers
Moors Sports Club cricketers
Sinhalese Sports Club cricketers
Place of birth missing (living people)